Joseph Loyd Jackson (born October 15, 1962) is a former American football linebacker who played one season with the Seattle Seahawks of the National Football League. He played college football at San Francisco State University and attended Monterey High School in Monterey, California. He was also a member of the Winnipeg Blue Bombers of the Canadian Football League.

References

External links
Just Sports Stats

Living people
1962 births
Players of American football from California
American football linebackers
Canadian football linebackers
American players of Canadian football
San Francisco State Gators football players
Winnipeg Blue Bombers players
Seattle Seahawks players
Sportspeople from Monterey, California
National Football League replacement players